The Tumbuka are an ethnic group living in Malawi, Zambia, and Tanzania. In Tumbuka mythology, Chiuta (meaning "Great Bow") is the Supreme Creator and is symbolised in the sky by the rainbow.

Tumbuka has many myths that constitute part of the Tumbuka cultural heritage. These myths, told around fires at night, often to the accompaniment of drumming and choral responses, aim to teach children moral behavior and to entertain.

Most of these myths have been weakened or lost over time, but many still remain; these vidokoni (stories) have a moral behind them.

There are three animals mentioned more than any others in Tumbuka mythology and these are fulu (tortoise), kalulu (hare), and chimbwi (hyena). Fulu is considered the wisest animal, chimbwe the villain, and kalulu the clever trickster and manipulator who can only be defeated by fulu.

Deities

Chiuta 
Chiuta, is the supreme deity figure in the traditional religions of the Tumbuka people, who resides in present-day Malawi. Chiuta is also sometimes known by the following names: Mulengi, Mwenco, and Wamtatakuya.

Chiuta is omnipresent, though shapeless. Though prayers can be made directly to Chiuta, ancestors and spirits play a large part in determining whether these prayers would be fulfilled. Offerings and appeals to ancestors and spirits can help sway their favors. Chiuta is associated with several natural phenomena that occurs from the sky, such as rain and thunderstorm.

Legends

Creation of the universe 
In the beginning, it is said that only earth and Chiuta existed. The earth was empty, and there was no body of water in its surface. Then Chiuta summoned the clouds, rain, and lightning to fall on earth. Later, Chiuta also went down to earth, followed by the first humans and all the animals.

Origin of death 
There are two versions of the origins of death associated with Chiuta. According to Lynch and Roberts (2010), the first version involved a chameleon and lizard. The chameleon was supposed to bring a message to humans, that when they die, they would be reincarnated. On the other hand, the lizard's message would instead tell humans that their deaths are permanent. Unfortunately, the lizard was faster than the chameleon, and thus death became a permanent state.

In the second version, told by Harvey (2005), the connection between the heavens, represented by the sky, and earth was cut when the humans discovered fire. Since all animals feared what the humans could do, they asked for Chiuta's help. Chiuta settled the issue, and tired from the conflict, decided to retreat to heavens and sever the connection between earth and heaven.

References